Badrinath  Legislative Assembly constituency is one of the 70 assembly constituencies of  Uttarakhand a northern state of India. Badrinath is part of Garhwal Lok Sabha constituency.

Members of Legislative Assembly

Election results

2022

See also
 Badri–Kedar (Uttarakhand Assembly constituency)

References

External links
  

Chamoli
Assembly constituencies of Uttarakhand
2002 establishments in Uttarakhand
Constituencies established in 2002
Chamoli district